Cave of the Bells is located in Sawmill Canyon on the eastern slopes of the Santa Rita Mountains of Santa Cruz County, Arizona. The cave contains a lake which is 80 meters below the entrance level. The nearby Onyx Cave is also of interest.

Access
Access to the cave is by reservation and a key security deposit. Permits and keys are accessible at the Forest Supervisor's Office.

References

Caves of Arizona
Landforms of Santa Cruz County, Arizona